All the Beautiful Sinners is a 2003 novel by  Stephen Graham Jones.

Characters
 Deputy Sheriff Jim Doe
 Special Agent Cody Mingus
 Special Agent Tim Creed
 Special Agent Shelia Watts
 The Tin Man
 Amos Pease

2003 American novels
American crime novels

Novels by Stephen Graham Jones
Native American novels